Jutamas Jitpong is a Thai amateur boxer. She represents Thailand at the 2020 Summer Olympics in Tokyo.

References

1998 births
Living people
Jutamas Jitpong
AIBA Women's World Boxing Championships medalists
Boxers at the 2020 Summer Olympics
Jutamas Jitpong
Jutamas Jitpong